The Archdeacon of Nottingham is a senior ecclesiastical officer in the Church of England Diocese of Southwell and Nottingham, who exercises supervision of clergy and has responsibility for church buildings within the Archdeaconry of Nottingham.

History
The ancient Archdeaconry of Nottingham was an extensive ecclesiastical jurisdiction within the Diocese of York, England. It was created around 1100 – at which time the first archdeacons were being created across the nation – and comprised almost the whole of the county of Nottinghamshire, and was divided into the four deaneries of Nottingham, Newark, Bingham and Retford. The archdeaconry remained as a division of York diocese for more than seven centuries until it was transferred by Order in Council to the Diocese of Lincoln on 5 September 1837.

The archdeaconry was transferred once more when it became part of the new diocese of Southwell on 5 February 1884, along with the Archdeaconry of Derby. it is now one of the two archdeaconries in the renamed Diocese of Southwell and Nottingham, the other being the Archdeaconry of Newark, which was formed by Order in Council on 11 June 1912 from the northern half of the Nottingham archdeaconry.

List of archdeacons
Some archdeacons without territorial titles are recorded from around the time of Thomas of Bayeux; see Archdeacon of York.

High Medieval
bef. 1128–aft. 1121: Geoffrey
bef. 1128–aft. 1135 (res.): Thurstan
bef. 1140–aft. 1151: Geoffrey Turcople
bef. 1157–aft. 1158: William (I)
aft. 1164–aft. 1179: John
bef. 1185–1190 (res.): Robert FitzRalph
bef. 1194–bef. 1214: William Testard
bef. 1218–aft. 1234: William de Bodham
bef. 1241–?: Walter de Taney
bef. 1248–aft. 1245: W. (probably de Taney or William {II})
bef. 1249–aft. 1249: William (II)
bef. 1256–aft. 1256: Peter
bef. 1262–aft. 1272: Thomas de Wythen
bef. 1287–bef. 1286 (d.): Henry of Skipton
12 March 1291 – 1310 (res.): William Pickering

Late Medieval
12 October 1310 – 1327 (res.): John Grandisson
12 July 1328–bef. 1329 (res.): Gilbert de Alberwick
1330–1331 (exch.): Manuel de Fieschi
1331–1348 (res.): Annibale Cardinal di Ceccano (Cardinal-priest of San Lorenzo in Lucina until 1333; Cardinal-bishop of Frascati thereafter)
1349–November 1349 (res.): John Bokyngham
1349–bef. 1351 (d.): Robert de Kildesby
13 June 1351 – 6 April 1352 (revoked): John de Bishopstone
13 December 1351–bef. 1353 (deprived): John de Brynkeleye (deprived)
9 June 1353 – 16 June 1397 (res.): Richard de Derby
10 August 1397 – 1415 (res.): John de Nottingham
21 August 1415 – 25 September 1418 (res.): John Wodham
27 December 1418–bef. 1419 (res.): Simon de Gaunstede
26 May 1419–bef. 1430 (d.): Robert Bowet
2 July 1430–bef. 1461 (d.): Nicholas Wymbyssh
27 May 1461–bef. 1476 (d.): Thomas Birom
28 September 1476–bef. 1499 (d.): William Worsley (also Dean of St Paul's from 1479)
18 August 1499–bef. 1506 (d.): Thomas Crossley
30 August 1506 – 25 April 1516 (d.): John Hatton, assistant bishop (titular Bishop of Negroponte)
8 August 1516–bef. 1528 (d.) William Fell
11 January 1528–bef. 1550 (d.): Cuthbert Marshall

Early modern
29 January 1550 – 1559 (deprived): Robert Pursglove, Bishop suffragan of Hull (aka Sylvester; deprived)
22 April 1560 – 27 June 1565 (res.): William Day (also a canon of St George's, Windsor from 1563)
30 June 1565 – 5 August 1590 (d.): John Louth
8 August 1590 – 1611 (res.): John King
1612–1627 (res.): Joseph Hall
11 February 1628 – 8 May 1635 (res.): Richard Baylie
9 May 1635–bef. 1642 (d.): William Robinson
The post was unfilled during the English Interregnum.
6 September 1660 – 4 July 1683 (d.): Vere Harcourt
13 August 1683 – 1685 (res.): Thomas White
23 November 1685 – 1 February 1690 (deprived): Samuel Crowbrow (deprived as a non-juror)
26 July 1690 – 6 February 1716 (d.): William Pearson
18 February 1716 – 24 August 1748 (d.): Robert Marsden
30 September 1748 – 11 July 1780 (d.): Hugh Thomas
2 August 1780 – 25 December 1810 (d.): Sir Richard Kaye, 6th Baronet (also Dean of Lincoln from 1783; styled Richard Kaye until 1789)
4 January 1810 – 23 March 1830 (d.): John Eyre
15 April 1830 – 21 April 1832 (res.): William Barrow
24 April 1832 – 13 August 1865 (d.): George Wilkins
On 5 September 1837, the archdeaconry was transferred to Lincoln diocese.

Late modern
1865–?: Henry Mackenzie (also Bishop suffragan of Nottingham, 1870–1877 (res.); died 1878)
1878–1894 (d.): Brough Maltby
Since 5 February 1884, the archdeaconry has been in Southwell diocese.
1894–1913 (ret.): John Richardson
1913–1915 (res.): Herbert Wild
1916–1936 (res.): William Conybeare (also Rector of {1916–1931} then Provost of {1931–1945} Southwell Minster)
1936–1944 (res.): Herbert Turner
1944–1949 (res.): Roger Wilson
1949–1960 (res.): John Phillips
1960–1977 (ret.): Michael Brown (afterwards archdeacon emeritus)
1978–1984 (res.): Roy Williamson
1984–1990 (res.): Clive Handford
1991–1996 (ret.): Tom Walker (afterwards archdeacon emeritus)
1996–2006 (ret.): Gordon Ogilvie
14 July 2007 – 25 July 2014: Peter Hill
26 October 20142019: Sarah Clark
3 July 2019present: Phil Williams

Notes

References

Sources

University of Nottingham, Manuscripts and Special Collections, Records of the Archdeacons of Nottingham.

Church of England lists
Lists of Anglicans
 
Diocese of York
Anglican ecclesiastical offices
Lists of English people
Archdeacon of Nottingham